The Rangrang Line is a non-electrified freight-only railway line of the Korean State Railway in Ryŏkp'o-guyŏk and Rangrang-guyŏk, P'yŏngyang, North Korea, running from Ryŏkp'o on the P'yŏngbu Line to Rangrang,

History
The Rangrang Line was opened in 1989 to assist with the construction of the East P'yŏngyang Thermal Power Plant that began that year; since then, the line is used to supply the power plant with coal.

Route 

A yellow background in the "Distance" box indicates that section of the line is not electrified.

References

Railway lines in North Korea
Standard gauge railways in North Korea